This list of governors of Kasaï Oriental Province includes governors of the former Kasaï-Oriental Province of the Democratic Republic of the Congo, created in 1966 by merging Lomami, Sankuru and Sud-Kasaï provinces, which had been split from the former Kasaï province.
It also contains lists of governors of the three predecessor provinces.

Kasaï Oriental was split in 2015 into the new, smaller Kasaï-Oriental, Lomami and Sankuru provinces.

Predecessor provinces (1962–1966)

The governors (or equivalent) of the provinces that were combined to form Kasaï Oriental Province were:

Lomami

Sankuru

Sud-Kasaï

Governors of Kasaï Oriental

The governors of Kasaï Oriental were:

See also

List of governors of Kasaï (former province)
Lists of provincial governors of the Democratic Republic of the Congo

References

Kasaï-Oriental
Governors of provinces of the Democratic Republic of the Congo